U.S. Route 74 (US 74) is an east–west United States highway that runs for  from Chattanooga, Tennessee to Wrightsville Beach, North Carolina. Primarily in North Carolina, it serves as an important highway from the mountains to the sea, connecting the cities of Asheville, Charlotte and Wilmington. The entire length of the route is known as Andrew Jackson Highway.

Route description

|-
|TN
|63.0
|101.4
|-
|NC
|451.8
|727.1
|-
|Total
|514.8
|828.5
|}

Tennessee

US 74 was designated in 1927.  The  route travels from the I-24/I-75 interchange, in Chattanooga, northeast to Cleveland, where it then continues east, along with US 64, to the North Carolina state line.  The highway is predominantly freeway or expressway grade four-lane, except between Ocoee and Ducktown, where it is a curvy two-lane mountain highway along the Ocoee River known as the Ocoee Scenic Byway.

TDOT's signage for US 74 is poor.  Most highways that cross it will typically only list I-75 or US 64 instead; I-75 completely ignores US 74 along its route, even ignoring it at their intersection, showing instead the US 64 Bypass.

North Carolina

In western North Carolina, US 74 enters the state with a concurrency with US 64.  Routed along on pre-existing highways in the region, specifically the: Appalachian Highway (at-grade expressway, except in the Nantahala Gorge) and the Great Smoky Mountains Expressway (controlled-access freeway, which is broken in three sections along the route); it shares a revolving door of concurrency changes with US 19, US 129, US 441 and US 23.  The alternating named highway (depending on grade of road) is considered the commercial back-bone and main truck route of Western North Carolina, connecting the cities of Murphy, Andrews, Bryson City, Cherokee, Sylva, and Waynesville.  In or around October, the fall colors create an influx of more tourists in the region.  In the winter months, the highway is the first to be salted and plowed; however, both the Nantahala Gorge and Balsam Gap tend to get the most snow and/or ice in the region and should be traveled with care.

North of Clyde, US 74 merges with Interstate 40 and goes east, in concurrency, to Asheville.  From there, it then goes southeast, in concurrency with Interstate 26 till Columbus, where it separates and continues east along a mostly controlled-access highway, except in Shelby, to Interstate 85, in Kings Mountain.

After crossing a unique weave intersection with Interstate 85, it joins with US 29 and travels through downtown Gastonia along Franklin Boulevard.  East of Gastonia, it becomes Wilkinson Boulevard as it go through McAdenville, Cramerton and Belmont.  After crossing the Lake Wylie/Catawba River, via Sloans Ferry Bridge, it enters Charlotte, with connections with Interstate 485 and Interstate 85/Charlotte Douglas International Airport, via Little Rock Road.  At Morehead Street, west of Center City, it splits with US 29 for Interstate 277 along the John Belk Freeway.  East of Center City, it goes solo again along Independence Freeway/Boulevard to Matthews, where it connects again with Interstate 485.

After leaving the Charlotte city limits, the route turns southeast as it goes through Stallings, Indian Trail and Monroe, where it briefly overlaps with US 601, before continuing east again through Wingate, Marshville, Peachland, Polkton, Wadesboro and Lilesville. On this stretch, prior to 2018, signage for the route was very poor, only being found at a few locations along the route. As part of the US 74 Monroe Bypass project, signage along the route was improved by the NCDOT.

Crossing the Pee Dee River and into the Sandhills region, US 74 meets up with Future Interstates I-73/I-74, in Rockingham. After a future interchange near NC 38 that will end its overlap with Interstate 73, US 74/Future I-74 continues southeast, bypassing Laurinburg and Maxton.  East of Maxton and through Lumberton, the highway is officially US 74/Interstate 74, before dropping back to Future I-74 west of Boardman; the concurrency with Future I-74 ends at Bolton, where a future interchange will split from US 74 to continue south towards South Carolina. This is one of only two instances (along with I-41 in Wisconsin) of similarly-numbered U.S. and Interstate routes being designated on the same road.

Near Chadbourn, US 74 overlaps with US 76, which continue mostly together till Wrightsville Beach, where US 74 dead-ends north and US 76 dead-ends south. Eastbound after the overlap with US 76, US 74 continues on Salisbury Street through some residential areas and businesses before coming to a traffic light separating Salisbury Street and Lumina Avenue. Drivers are directed to take a left on to North Lumina Avenue to continue on US 74 while South Lumina Avenue connects to Jack Parker Boulevard, which leads to US 76. Approximately  on North Lumina, US 74 reaches its eastern terminus at a dead end circle with an entrance to the local Shell Island Resort hotel.

The highway connects the cities and towns of Whiteville, Lake Waccamaw, and Wilmington.  The road through the Cape Fear region is flat, surrounded by parts of the Green Swamp.

ADHS corridors
US 74 overlaps with two corridors that are part of the Appalachian Development Highway System (ADHS), which is part of Appalachian Regional Commission (ARC).  Passed in 1965, the purpose of ADHS is to generate economic development in previously isolated areas, supplement the interstate system, connect Appalachia to the interstate system, and provide access to areas within the Region as well as to markets in the rest of the nation.

 Corridor A – From I-285, in Sandy Springs, Georgia to I-40, near Clyde, North Carolina.  US 74 overlap from US 23, in Dillsboro, to I-40, near Clyde; it is also completed with divided four-lane limited-access and controlled-access sections.  This corridor is signed as "Appalachian Highway," in white text on blue background.
 Corridor K – From I-75, in Cleveland, Tennessee, to US 23, in Dillsboro, North Carolina.  The entire  section of US 74 is authorized for ADHS funding.  The majority of the route is a four-lane limited-access road, with a section that is controlled-access between Bryson City and Cherokee.  Current two-lane sections that are impending improvements are: Ocoee River to Ducktown and the Nantahala Gorge.  In North Carolina, this corridor is signed as "Appalachian Highway," in white text on blue background.

Scenic byways
The Ocoee Scenic Byway is a  National Forest Scenic Byway that traverses through the Cherokee National Forest, in East Tennessee.  19 miles of the Byway are concurrent with US 74 (in addition to U.S. Route 64).  Features include the Ocoee Whitewater Center and scenic bluffs along Ocoee River and Gorge.

Nantahala Byway is a  byway from Marble to Whittier; it is known for its scenic views of the Nantahala Gorge, The Great Smoky Mountains Railroad, and whitewater rafting on the Nantahala River.  US 74 overlaps  of the byway from Marble to Bryson City.  The byway also overlaps with US 19 and US 129.

Dedicated and memorial names

US 74 features several dedicated bridges and stretches of highway throughout its route.

 American Indian Highway  – this name was authored by Tuscarora Indian Robert M. Chavis, he launched a campaign to obtain support from all the city councils and the Robeson county Commissioners, they all signed onto the partition Mr. Chavis sent to the NCDOT and it was approved by the state DOT,   official North Carolina name of the  section of US 74/I-74 in Robeson County (mile marker 191-213). It is named to honor the large American Indian population in Robeson County (approved: November 8, 2001).
 Andrew Jackson Highway – Official North Carolina name of US 74 throughout the state, except in Robeson County (it is still named along the old sections of US 74 now called US 74 Business and Alternate).  It was established to honor of the seventh President of the United States, Andrew Jackson (approved: April 4, 1963). Signage is found primarily east of Charlotte, overlapping other official North Carolina dedicated sections.
 C. Heide Trask Bridge – Official North Carolina name of bridge over the Inland Waterway, in Wrightsville Beach (approved: June 9, 1958).
 Cameron Morrison Bridge – Was an official North Carolina name of the first bridge and later westbound US 74 bridge, over the Pee Dee River.  It was named in honor of Governor Morrison, who was a Richmond County native.  The bridge, built in 1925, was dedicated to Morrison originally at an unknown date; in 1983, after the bridge was reconstructed to modern standards, it was rededicated to R.W. Goodman.
 Dean Arledge Memorial Highway – Official North Carolina name of US 74 between I-26 and NC 9, in Polk County (approved: March 3, 2000).
 G R Kindley Freeway – Official North Carolina name of US 74/I-74 along the Rockingham-Hamlet bypass.  It is named in honor of the former mayor of Rockingham (approved: September 8, 2000).
 Herman H. West Bridge – Official North Carolina name of bridge over the Valley River, in Cherokee County.  It was dedicated in honor of the former state Senator and Representative (approved: September 8, 2000).
 Hezekiah Pridgen, Sr. Bridge – Official North Carolina name of bridge over US 701, in Columbus County (approved: August 4, 1995).
 James Archibald Hardison Bridge – Official North Carolina name of the eastbound US 74 bridge, over the Pee Dee River.  It is named in honor of the former Highway Commissioner and member of the Highway Commission under three governors, from 1933-1937 and 1953-1961 (approved: December 30, 1958).
 J. Ollie Harris Highway – Official North Carolina name of US 74 Bypass at Kings Mountain (approved: October 3, 1997).
 James Arthur Callahan Freeway – Official North Carolina name of a  section of US 74/I-26 in Rutherford County (approved: May 10, 1992).
 John Belk Freeway – Official North Carolina name of US 74/I-277, from I-77/US 21 to Independence Boulevard, in Uptown Charlotte.  It is named in honor of John M. Belk, who was mayor of Charlotte from 1969-1977 (approved: September 11, 1981).
 R.W. Goodman Bridge – Official North Carolina name of the westbound US 74 bridge, over the Pee Dee River.  It is named in honor of the former Richmond County sheriff R. W. Goodman (approved: March 11, 1983).
 Senator Jesse Helms Freeway – Official North Carolina name of US 74 between US 601 to the Anson-Union County line (approved: January 8, 1993). Named in honor of the late five-term U.S. senator who was born in Union County in 1921.
 Solon David Smart Memorial Highway – Official North Carolina name of highway from NC 120 to US 221A, in Rutherford County (approved: December 1, 2000).
 W Cliff Martin Highway – Official North Carolina name of US 74 from Union County line to Wadesboro, in Anson County (approved: May 2, 1997).

History
Established as an original U.S. Route in late 1926, US 74 traversed from Asheville to Chadbourn, in North Carolina.  It was extended eastward in late 1934 to Wilmington, replacing an old alignment of US 17.

In 1936, US 74 was extended eastward again from Wilmington, via Market Street, to Wrightsville Beach, then going north on Lumina Avenue to its current eastern terminus. US 74 also spawned two alternate routes the same year, the first and shortest in Leland, and a second in Shelby; which eventually replaced all of US 74 through the downtown area by 1949 (later renamed US 74 Business in 1960).

In 1937, US 74 was rerouted through Kings Mountain, replacing part of NC 7.  Its old alignment became an alternate route, but was replaced a year later by both NC 161 and NC 274.

By 1949, US 74 was on its first bypass around Rutherfordton, via Ruth; its former route becoming an alternate route (later renamed US 74 Business in 1960).  In 1952, the first Monroe Bypass was completed, leaving a short-lived alternate route going through the downtown area.  By 1953, the first bypass around Rockingham was completed, leaving a short lived alternate route through the downtown area.

In 1970, US 74 was placed on new freeway alignment bypassing Spindale, Forest City, Ellenboro, and Mooresboro; the old route was replaced by an extension of US 74 Business.  In 1973, US 74 was realigned onto new road south of Lumberton.  In 1975, US 74/US 76 was rerouted onto new freeway bypass south of Leland and then east of Belville, its old alignment becoming secondary roads.  In 1976, US 74/US 76 was bypassed north of Chadbourn and Whiteville, leaving behind US 74 Bus./US 76 Bus.

In 1984, Maxton was bypassed, replaced by an extension of US 74 Bus.  In 1985, US 74 was rerouted north of Kings Mountain onto new freeway bypass; its old alignment becoming US 74 Bus.  In 1986, Hallsboro and Lake Waccamaw were bypassed; its old alignment replaced by NC 214.

Also in 1986, US 74 was extended west, from Asheville to Chattanooga, Tennessee.  The routing extension started at its former western terminus with US 70, going northerly, in concurrency with US 70, to I-240, where it overlapped briefly before joining US 19/US 23.  From Asheville, in concurrency with US 19/US 23, it went through Canton and Lake Junaluska.  From Lake Junaluska, in concurrency with US 23, it went through Waynesville.  Near Dillsboro it switches US 23 for US 441 and continues till it splits north within the Qualla Boundary.  West of Bryson City, it overlaps with NC 28.  In Topton, it joins with US 129 and continues southwesterly till at Murphy, where it joins with US 64 and separates from US 19/US 129.  Heading west, in concurrency with US 64, it enters Tennessee; traversing through Ducktown, it reaches Cleveland, where it then follows the US 64 Bypass to I-75.  Continuing southeasterly, as a hidden concurrency with I-75, it connects with Chattanooga, ending at its new terminus at I-24.

In 1990, US 74 was rerouted onto I-277 (John Belk Freeway), this left a section of Independence Boulevard that was still overlapped with NC 27. In 1992-1993, Bolton was bypassed to the north, with its old alignment becoming an extension of NC 214.

East of Columbus, it traverses along new freeway to Forest City, where it meets back with its old alignment. The former routing between Asheville and Forest City becomes US 74A. In 1996, US 74 was rerouted through Wilmington. In late 1997, US 74 was rerouted onto I-40, between Clyde and Asheville.

In 2002, US 74 was placed on its second bypass around both Rockingham and Hamlet, its old alignment becoming US 74 Business.  In 2005, US 74 was rerouted north of downtown Wilmington.  In 2007, US 74 was placed on new freeway, in concurrency with I-74 from Maxton to just east of I-95; its old alignment becoming US 74 Alternate.

In 2018, US 74's new toll bypass around Monroe was completed.

Independence Boulevard
Independence Boulevard and Independence Expressway are two major interconnected roads in Mecklenburg County, North Carolina that carry US 74. Originally constructed in the 1940s and early 1950s, Independence Boulevard was the city of Charlotte's first expressway. The road has undergone numerous realignments, extensions, upgrades, truncations, and renamings since the mid-20th century.

Ben Douglas, former mayor of Charlotte and member of the North Carolina State Highway Commission, helped lead the push for the urban highway project in the 1940s that would become Independence Boulevard. In 1946, Charlotte voters passed a referendum in favor of a $200,000 bond issue to fund the project; this was coupled with over $2 million in federal funding. The expressway was to be named after Independence Park that was largely demolished to make way for the road; the name suggestion was coined by City Clerk Lillian Hoffman on May 4, 1949 after a previous suggestion naming it after the current mayor, Herbert Baxter, was rejected. Construction commenced in the late 1940s and the new expressway which traversed east–west along the southern part of the city opened in two parts; the first opened to traffic in 1949 and the other opened in 1950. US 74 and NC 27 were subsequently shifted from their central business district alignments to the new expressway.

Major changes to Independence Boulevard occurred in the 1980s. A portion of West Independence Boulevard was converted from expressway to limited-access freeway and made a part of the John Belk Freeway and Interstate 277. The portion west of Interstate 77 was renamed Wilkinson Boulevard. A new intersection with I-277 (which would also connect to the Brookshire Freeway that was upgraded as part of the I-277 project) was constructed and the connecting freeway along with the updated portion of East Independence Boulevard was given the name Independence Freeway; US 74 was shifted to this new alignment. After the massive transportation revamp, a few disconnected segments of the original Independence Boulevard remained. These segments were later reorganized and given the names Carson Boulevard, Stonewall Street, and South Independence Boulevard; the latter was downgraded to a surface street and renamed Charlottetown Avenue in 2007 to prevent confusion with the unconnected East Independence Boulevard. In 2021, Stonewall Street was renamed to Brooklyn Village Avenue to honor a Charlotte neighborhood that had been demolished for expansion of the Uptown area.

The freeway and bus lanes of Independence Freeway were extended to Albemarle Road in 2005. The limited-access road extension has caused numerous businesses along the corridor to leave the area and vacate their commercial real estate, resulting in brownfield land.

"American Indian Highway" controversy
In Robeson County, the highway is designated "American Indian Highway," a name that was the brain child of Robert M. Chavis, the  Wolfclan chief of the NC Tuscarora; Cherokee Indians of Robeson County, and Nottoway Nation, who authored the name in the late 1990s. American Indian people of Robeson County, NC had attempted to remove Andrew Jackson's name from the highway for some sixty years. Knowing that the new US 74 was to come, Chavis started a campaign to change the name to American Indian Highway. Chavis did this in honor of all the Indian people that had lost their lives along the Trail of Tears during the Indian Removal Act of the 1830s authored by Andrew Jackson. Chavis was cited in many newspapers across North Carolina stating that the name should be changed, because that name on this section of road was tantamount to having a major road named Adolf Hitler that ran across a Jewish state or county.  Chavis, with the help of the Tuscarora East of the Mountains, obtained the information on how to attempt the name change from Rep. Ronnie Sutton and the NCDOT. Then Chavis presented the reasons for the name change to all the cities of Robeson county and the Robeson County Commissioners. Once he obtained support from these entities he presented the proposal to the NC-DOT. Rep.  Sutton supported the name change at the state level and the name change was approved by the NC-DOT. The new signs of American Indian Highway were placed on the new sections of I-74 once the highway construction was completed.

Future
In Graham County, NCDOT has proposed to relocate US 74 onto a new divided four-lane highway from Robbinsville to Stecoah.  This new routing will feature controlled at-grade intersections, viaduct and tunnel (at Stecoah Gap).  At a cost of $383 million, right-of-way acquisition is scheduled to begin in 2014 and construction to begin in 2016; however, this is subject to reprioritization.  The project is part of an overall project to bypass the current routing through the Nantahala Gorge, where bottlenecks are common along the two-lane highway through protected valley area within the Nantahala National Forest.  The overall project, from Andrews to Almond, would complete a four-lane expressway from Cherokee County to Asheville.

The US 74 Bypass, in Cleveland County, is a  controlled-access highway bypassing north of Shelby.  When completed, it will improve vehicle capacity along the US 74 corridor, reduce future traffic congestion, increase safety and improve roadway continuity between I-26 and I-85.  Being built in six sections, the cost is estimated at $295.9 million; currently, three of the six sections are fully funded with construction starting in 2014, ending in 2017.

In Mooresboro, there are plans to convert the last remaining at-grade intersections (US 74 Business/Lattimore Road/Academy Street) into an interchange, as well as improving the bridges over Sandy Run Creek. When the interchange and the rest of the Shelby Bypass are completed, US 74 will become a full freeway between I-26 in Asheville and I-85 in Kings Mountain.

The Independence Widening project, in Mecklenburg County, is to enhance and improve traffic flow and safety along US 74 in east Charlotte, by converting the corridor into an expressway grade highway from Center City to Matthews.  Current construction is being done on three new interchanges at Sharon-Amity Road, Idlewild Road and Conference Drive.  The cost of this section is at $101.2 million, with construction completed by October 15, 2016.

In Union and Anson counties, the US 74 freeway upgrade and Wadesboro Bypass is an estimated $741 million project.  Plans include linking with future Monroe Bypass to existing Rockingham Bypass with upgrading to existing facilities to freeway standards and bypass the cities of both Marshville (to the south) and Wadesboro (to the north).  The project is currently unfunded.

Junction list

See also

 Special routes of U.S. Route 74
 North Carolina Bicycle Route 2
 North Carolina Bicycle Route 5

References

External links

 
 NCRoads.com: US 74
 NCRoads.com: US 74-A
 NCRoads.com: US 74 Business
 Endpoints of U.S. Highway 74

 
74
74
74
Transportation in Hamilton County, Tennessee
Transportation in Bradley County, Tennessee
Transportation in Polk County, Tennessee
Transportation in Cherokee County, North Carolina
Transportation in Graham County, North Carolina
Transportation in Swain County, North Carolina
Transportation in Jackson County, North Carolina
Transportation in Haywood County, North Carolina
Transportation in Buncombe County, North Carolina
Transportation in Polk County, North Carolina
Transportation in Rutherford County, North Carolina
Transportation in Cleveland County, North Carolina
Transportation in Gaston County, North Carolina
Transportation in Mecklenburg County, North Carolina
Transportation in Union County, North Carolina
Transportation in Anson County, North Carolina
Transportation in Richmond County, North Carolina
Transportation in Scotland County, North Carolina
Transportation in Robeson County, North Carolina
Transportation in Columbus County, North Carolina
Transportation in Brunswick County, North Carolina
Transportation in New Hanover County, North Carolina
Transportation in Charlotte, North Carolina
Transportation in Chattanooga, Tennessee